Euclasta vitralis is a moth in the family Crambidae. It was described by Koen V. N. Maes in 1997. It is found in Nepal and Sri Lanka.

References

Moths described in 1997
Pyraustinae